Craig Elliott (born July 13, 1971) is an illustrator, visual development artist and layout artist who works in the animation industry. After graduating from the Art Center College of Design in Pasadena, California in 1996, he went on to work on numerous films for Disney Feature Animation, DreamWorks, Nickelodeon and Fox Animation Studios. Craig also exhibits his fine art illustrations and paintings at both Wondercon and Comic-Con International as well as occasionally teaching at the Art Center College of Design and Gnomon School of Visual Effects.

Books and comics
Craig has painted comic book and cover artwork for Dark Horse Comics, appeared in various art periodicals such as Spectrum, Erotic Fantasy Art and The World's Greatest Erotic Art of Today as well as self publishing his own projects through the Aristata imprint.

In 2008, Craig was invited to contribute a piece to the Totoro Forest Project, a fund raising exhibition/auction to support the national trust Totoro Forest Foundation that was founded by Oscar Award winning film maker Hayao Miyazaki.

Works
Rise of the Argonauts (2008) (Video Game) (concept artist)

Filmography
Hercules (1997) (visual development artist)
Mulan (1998) (key layout artist)
The Emperor's New Groove (2000) (visual development artist)
Treasure Planet (2002) (visual development artist/key assistant layout artist)
Shark Tale (2004) (visual development artist)
Father of the Pride (2004) (visual development artist)
Home on the Range (2004) (key assistant layout artist)
Flushed Away (2006) (visual development artist)
Bee Movie (2007) (visual development artist)
Enchanted (2007) (layout artist)
The Princess and the Frog (2009)  (visual development artist)
The Spook's Apprentice (2009) (visual development artist)
The Penguins of Madagascar (2009) (visual development artist)
Hoodwinked 2: Hood vs. Evil (2010) (visual development artist)
Puss in Boots (2011) (visual development artist)
The Lorax (2012) (visual development artist)
Monsters vs. Aliens (2013) (visual development artist)
Seventh Son (2014) (Concept artist)

References

External links
 Craig Elliott Concept Design, Fine Art and Illustration
 
 Craig Elliott profile at www.linesandcolors.com

1971 births
Living people
Art Center College of Design people